Flux + Mutability is the second collaboration between David Sylvian and Holger Czukay.  It was released in September 1989.  The music consists of two instrumental tracks improvised by the participants.

The album was reissued by Gronland in 2018.

Production
The album was recorded at Can's Inner Space Studio.

Critical reception
Reviewing the reissue package, Pitchfork wrote that "Czukay’s side is the more active of the two. Driven by a small drum pattern played by Can percussionist Jaki Liebezeit, the piece is evocatively subtitled 'A Big, Bright, Colourful World'. Its light synth drones and radio noise are illuminated by the lens flares of Markus Stockhausen’s flugelhorn and then slightly darkened by some fragmented guitar figures added by another Can member, Michael Karoli." The Rolling Stone Album Guide opined that Flux was the more interesting of the two Czukay/Sylvian collaborations, but wrote that "why anyone would bother making such a distinction is hard to say, given the generally vacuous nature of the music." Fact wrote that "while Plight & Premonition felt like a study in unease, wracked with paranoia, Flux + Mutability admits the possibility, if not any certainty, of earthly bliss."

Track listing 
"Flux (A Big, Bright, Colourful World)" (Sylvian, Czukay) – 16:56
"Mutability (A New Beginning Is in the Offing)" (Sylvian, Czukay) – 20:59

Personnel
Holger Czukay – electric guitar (1), bass guitar (1), dictaphone (1), radio (1), engineer
David Sylvian – guitar (1, 2), keyboard instruments (1, 2), art director
Michael Karoli – electric guitar (1)
Michi - voice (1)
Markus Stockhausen – flugelhorn (1)
Jaki Liebezeit – percussion (1), African flute (2)

Additional personnel
René Tinner - technical advice and assistant
Yuka Fujii - art director, cover art, photography design
David Buckland - front cover photography

Published by Opium (Arts) Ltd./Spoon Music

References

External links
 Holger Czukay's discography
 David Sylvian On Collaborating With Holger Czukay

1989 albums
Holger Czukay albums
David Sylvian albums
Virgin Records albums